Sam Mangusho Cheptoris is a Ugandan politician. He is the Cabinet Minister of Water and Environment in the Cabinet of Uganda. He was appointed to that position on 6 June 2016. In 2021 he was elected as member of parliament for Kapchorwa Municipality.

Background and education
Sam Cheptoris was born in present-day Kapchorwa District, on 12 December 1949. He studied at Nabumali High School, before attending the University of Nairobi where he graduated with a Bachelor of Arts. Later, he studied at Makerere University, graduating first with a Postgraduate Diploma in Education and later with a Master of Education.

Academic career
In 1975, after his undergraduate studies in Nairobi, Cheptoris served as a teacher of English and English Literature at Sebei College, Tegeres. Between 1978 and 1981, he served as deputy head teacher at the same school. After brief stints at Comboni College and at Gamatui Girls School, he came back  to Sebei College as Headmaster in 1998. He retired from academics in 2009.

Political career
In 2011 Cheptoris won the Kapchorwa District LC5 position on the National Resistance Movement political party ticket. After one five-year term, he successfully contested for the newly created Kapchorwa Municipality constituency in the Parliament of Uganda. On 6 June 2016, he was appointed as Cabinet Minister of Water and Environment. Among his priorities as a member of parliament are: (a) to establish an irrigation system in the constituency to boost agricultural production, (b) to assist in the creation of a university in the sub-region, (c) to assist in the re-establishment of "Elgon Cooperative Union",  and (d) to establish a water and sewerage system in Kapchorwa Municipality.

Business interests
Cheptoris is the proprietor of (a) Kapchrowa Standard Academy, a secondary school in Kapchorwa District and (b) Cheminy Standard Academy, a secondary school in neighboring Kween District.

See also
 Cabinet of Uganda
 Parliament of Uganda

References

External links
Website of the Parliament of Uganda

Living people
1949 births
Kapchorwa District
People from Kapchorwa District
Members of the Parliament of Uganda
Government ministers of Uganda
Eastern Region, Uganda
Makerere University alumni
University of Nairobi alumni
National Resistance Movement politicians
21st-century Ugandan politicians